The Gillham House is a historic house in rural Garland County, Arkansas. It is a single story log dogtrot, with a side gable roof and a shed-roof porch across the front. Its original log structure is visible, with its log pens fastened by V-notch and center-notch joints. The house was built about 1866 by Philip Gillham, a Union Army veteran of the American Civil War.

The house was listed on the National Register of Historic Places in 1994.

See also
National Register of Historic Places listings in Garland County, Arkansas

References

Houses on the National Register of Historic Places in Arkansas
Houses completed in 1866
Buildings and structures in Garland County, Arkansas
National Register of Historic Places in Garland County, Arkansas